Savannakhet Airport  is an international airport near Savannakhet, Laos.

Overview
This airport is now served by Lao Airlines as an intermediate stop in its 3 times/week Pakse-Bangkok service, which commenced in 2008.

The US military has also been known to use this airport with C-130 Hercules airplanes supporting teams engaged in searching for remains of servicemen declared MIA in the Vietnam war.

Airlines and destinations

References

External links

Airports in Laos
Buildings and structures in Savannakhet province
Savannakhet